Peng Hao (born 18 October 1993) is a Chinese footballer currently playing as a goalkeeper for Jiangxi Beidamen.

Career statistics

Club
.

Notes

References

1993 births
Living people
Chinese footballers
Association football goalkeepers
China League Two players
Zhejiang Professional F.C. players
Jiangxi Beidamen F.C. players